William C. Wertenbaker (September 15, 1875 – March 24, 1933) was an American football coach and physician.  He served as the head football coach at Wofford College (1895), the University of Richmond (1897), the University of South Carolina (1898), and Washington and Lee University (1900, 1902), compiling a career college football record of 11–16. Wertenbaker practiced medicine in New Castle and Wilmington, Delaware, specializing in obstetrics and gynaecology.

Wertenbaker was born on September 15, 1875, in Charlottesville, Virginia.  He died on March 24, 1933, at Johns Hopkins Hospital in Baltimore, Maryland following a brief illness. He had a son, Charles, born circa 1901, who later became a foreign editor of Time.

Head coaching record

References

External links
 

1875 births
1933 deaths
20th-century American physicians
American gynecologists
American obstetricians
Richmond Spiders football coaches
South Carolina Gamecocks athletic directors
South Carolina Gamecocks football coaches
Wofford Terriers football coaches
Washington and Lee Generals football coaches
Washington and Lee University faculty
Sportspeople from Charlottesville, Virginia
Physicians from Delaware